Rolling Kansas is a 2003 independent film directed and co-written by Oscar-nominated actor Thomas Haden Church.

Plot
Rolling Kansas is about five men (a T-shirt salesman, his two brothers, a large narcoleptic nursing student, and a dim-witted gas station attendant) who embark on a journey to find a secret government marijuana field in Kansas that was discovered on a map that three of the young men's parents left for them (known as the Hippies Murphy). On the way, they encounter cops, crazy geese, strippers, and a crazy old man played by Rip Torn.

Cast
James Roday ...Dick Murphy
Sam Huntington ...Dinkadoo Murphy
Jay Paulson ...Dave Murphy
Charlie Finn ...Kevin Haub
Ryan McDow ...Hunter Bullette
Rip Torn ...Oldman
Lisa Marie Newmyer ...Satin
Thomas Haden Church ...Agent Madsen/Trooper (uncredited)
Kevin Pollak ...Agent Brinkley (uncredited)
Mia Zottoli ...Cheyenne

Production
The film was shot in Lockhart, Texas.

Soundtrack album details
"Ride With Yourself" – Rhino Bucket
"Mindrocker" – Fenwyck
"Marseilles" – The Angels
"Beat to Death Like a Dog" – Rhino Bucket
"I Was Told" – Rhino Bucket
"Alabama Sky" – The Dusky Picks
"No Friend of Mine" – Rhino Bucket
"One Night Stand" – Rhino Bucket
"Ebony Eyes" – Bob Welch
"She Rides" – Rhino Bucket
"Train Ride" – Rhino Bucket
"Golden Ball and Chain" – Jason & the Scorchers

References

External links
 

American independent films
2003 films
American films about cannabis
Films directed by Thomas Haden Church
American road movies
2000s road movies
2003 comedy films
Gold Circle Films films
Films scored by Anthony Marinelli
Films set in Texas
Films set in Oklahoma
Films set in Kansas
Films set in 1986
Cannabis in Kansas
Stoner films
2003 directorial debut films
2000s English-language films
2000s American films